The Prime Ministers Avenue is a collection of busts of the prime ministers of Australia, located at the Ballarat Botanical Gardens in Ballarat, Victoria.  The busts are displayed as bronze portraits mounted on polished granite pedestals.  It attracts thousands of visitors annually.

The 29th Prime Minister, Malcolm Turnbull, was the most recent Prime Minister to be added to the Avenue. He attended the unveiling in November 2022.

History
Richard Crouch, the original donor of the first six busts, was born in Ballarat in 1868. He was MP for Corio, representing the Protectionist Party from 1901 to 1909 and the Commonwealth Liberal Party from 1909 to 1910, and was at the time the youngest member of the House of Representatives. He was also a Labor Party MP for Corangamite from 1929 to 1931.

The first six busts were unveiled on 2 March 1940 by the Governor of Victoria, Winston Dugan. Crouch also bequeathed funds for maintaining the project. It is claimed that Crouch's motivation for starting the collection was "his patronage and love of fine arts, which he supported and endowed in many other ways, and the influence of two parliamentary terms under the statesmen Barton, Deakin, Watson, Fisher and Scullin prompted him to return to Ballarat something of what it had given him".

Sculptors
 The busts of Barton, Deakin, Watson, Reid, Fisher, Cook, Hughes, Bruce, Scullin, Lyons, Page, Menzies, Fadden and Curtin were created by Wallace Anderson (1888–1975), born at Dean near Ballarat. He is best known for his work "Simpson and His Donkey" located at the Melbourne Shrine of Remembrance.
 The creator of Forde's bust is unknown.
 The bust of Chifley was created during Chifley's election campaign in 1946 by Ken Palmer, born in 1925 at Ballarat.
 The busts of Holt, McEwen, Gorton, McMahon and Whitlam were created by Victor Greenhalgh (1900–1983), born at Ballarat.  He is best known for his large statue of King George V which dominates the Sturt Street plantation in Ballarat. Greenhalgh was commissioned to create eight of the busts.
 The busts of Fraser, Hawke, Keating, Howard, Rudd and Gillard were created by Peter Nicholson, born in 1946 in Melbourne.  He is best known for his cartoons in the Nation Review, Financial Review and The Age.  Nicholson's works have followed his philosophy that the busts should impart an expression of the character of the individual.
 The bust of Abbott was created by Linda Klarfeld, born in 1976 in Prague, Czechoslovakia. In creating the bust she attempted to impart a sense of Abbott's perspective, including the "stamina to cope with day to day criticism".
The bust of Malcolm Turnbull was created by Linda Klarfeld and was commissioned using funding from the City of Ballarat's Public Art Program.

Criticisms
Fraser's bust was originally created by Victor Greenhalgh. However, Greenhalgh and others were critical of the final casting. Following Greenhalgh's death in 1983, Peter Nicholson was asked to create a new bust for Fraser, which was completed after the bust of Fraser's successor Hawke had been installed.

Nicholson believes that John Howard was dissatisfied with the size of his lower lip, and it is said that Paul Keating was unhappy with his bust's weak chin and pointy nose.

Future
With the cost of each bust ranging from $45,000 to $65,000, historic bequeathed funds for the construction of busts for future Prime Ministers ran out after Julia Gillard's bust. The bust of Tony Abbott, was funded by the Ballarat council in 2017. The project is a part of the City of Ballarat's Arts & Culture Public Art Program.

The Ballarat council has repeatedly and unsuccessfully lobbied the federal government for funding in perpetuity, and has also called for expressions of interest from sculptors.

Busts

See also
 Prime Ministers' Corridor of Oaks – Faulconbridge, New South Wales

References

External links
Prime Ministers Avenue Brochure, Ballarat Botanical Gardens
Prime Ministers Avenue, Monument Australia

Prime Ministers Avenue, Ballarat, 1958, victorianplaces.com.au

Buildings and structures in Ballarat
Monuments and memorials in Victoria (Australia)
Outdoor sculptures in Australia
Prime Minister of Australia